Lace Up is the debut studio album by American rapper Machine Gun Kelly. It was released on October 9, 2012, by Bad Boy Records and Interscope Records. Puff Daddy, who served as the executive producer on the album, enlisted the guest appearances from Cassie, DMX, Planet VI and Avenged Sevenfold; as well as the production that was provided by Alex da Kid, JP Did This 1 and J.R. Rotem, among others. The album was supported by four singles: "Wild Boy" featuring Waka Flocka Flame, "Invincible" featuring Ester Dean, and "Hold On (Shut Up)" featuring Young Jeezy, along with a promotional single, "Stereo" featuring Alex Fitts.

Reviews for the record were generally positive, but critics felt that it was a disappointment, compared to his previous mixtapes. Lace Up debuted at number 4 on the Billboard 200, with first-week sales of 57,000 copies in the United States. It was certified gold by the Recording Industry Association of America (RIAA), denoting sales of over 500,000 copies.

Singles 
The album's lead single, "Wild Boy" was released on September 27, 2011. The song features guest vocals from fellow American rapper Waka Flocka Flame, with production being provided by GB Hitz and Southside. It was initially featured on his fourth mixtape, Rage Pack (2011), and on his debut EP, Half Naked & Almost Famous (2012). The song debuted at number 98 on the US Billboard Hot 100 on the week of January 28, 2012, and number 49 on the Hot R&B/Hip-Hop Songs chart. It serves as his first song to be charted on both Billboard charts.

The album's second single, "Invincible" was released to digital retailers in the United States on April 24, 2012, and was solicited to rhythmic contemporary radio and contemporary hit radio on May 15 to July 31, 2012, respectively. The song features guest vocals from American singer-songwriter Ester Dean, and was produced by British producer Alex da Kid. MGK shot a music video for the single, which features an appearance from the singer Ester Dean, and uploaded the video on YouTube under his VEVO account, on June 3, 2012.

"Hold On (Shut Up)" featuring Young Jeezy, was released as the album's third single on August 6, 2012. The music video was released on November 19, 2012.

Promotional singles 
On September 20, 2012, "Stereo" was released with an accompanying music video, as the album's promotional single (although this track was formerly part of the mixtape with same title as the album). The song features guest vocals from Alex Fitts. The track would also be included, alongside "Invincible" and "Hold On (Shut Up)", as part of the MGK's Music Unlimited exclusive EP, titled Lace Up - The Prelude (released on October 2, 2012).

Critical reception 

Lace Up received favorable reviews but music critics found the record overall uneven, compared to Kelly's previous mixtapes. At Metacritic, which assigns a normalized rating out of 100 to reviews from mainstream critics, the album received average score of 69, based on 6 reviews which indicates generally favourable reviews. Adam Fleischer of XXL praised the production throughout the album and MGK for being consistent with his rapid-fire flow concluding with, "though he may no longer be quite the underdog he once was, rapping like it—at least for now—still works." Fred Thomas of AllMusic also praised the album for its production and putting MGK in the spotlight, calling it "a beast of a debut, and some of the heaviest mainstream-friendly hip-hop happening in 2012, a picture of young energy at its zenith."

Edwin Ortiz of HipHopDX gave a mixed review of the album, praising tracks like "Edge of Destruction" and "D3mons" for their intensity but found "Invincible" and "All We Have" put MGK into "industry purgatory." He concluded with, "Lace Up is an imbalanced project that fails to establish MGK’s grand message. His debut is decent at best, with hope that his following projects yield better results." Phillip Mlynar of Spin felt that the special guests throughout the album were more of a hindrance to the main artist saying, "Instead of turning this debut proper into an expansive listen, the guests seem like they're papering over holes in both the music and the message."

Commercial performance 
The album debuted at number 4 on the US Billboard 200, with first-week sales of 57,000 copies. It slid down to number 22 in its second week giving it a total of 65,000 copies. Sliding down to number 37 in week three it sold 10,000 more copies. As of September 2015, the album has sold 263,000 copies in the United States.

Track listing 
Album credits adapted from official liner notes.

Notes
  signifies a co-producer
  signifies an additional producer
 "Save Me" features additional vocals from M. Shadows.
 "La La La (The Floating Song)" features additional vocals from Betty Idol.

Sample credits, taken from liner notes.
"See My Tears" contains a sample of "Rain" written and performed by Armin van Buuren and Cathy Burton.
"D3MONS" contains a sample of "Sorrow" (from the Gladiator soundtrack) written and performed by Lisa Gerrard and Hans Zimmer.

Personnel
Credits for Lace Up adapted from AllMusic.

 Klaus Badlet — composer
 Kenneth Bartolomei — composer
 Chris Bellman — mastering
 Jon "JRB" Bishop — producer
 Blackbear — featured artist
 Snaz — producer
 Boi-1da — producer
 Dame Grease — producer
 Michael "Silent Mike" Brascom — composer, producer
 Leslie Brathwaite — mixing
 Adrian Broekhuyse — composer
 J Browz — bass, guitar
 Bun B — featured artist
 Sean "Diddy" Combs — executive producer
 Kevin "KD" Davis — mixing
 M. De Geoij — composer
 Ester Dean — composer, featured artist
 Aubry "Big Juice" Delaine — engineer
 Steve "Rock Star" Dickey — mixing
 Alexander Diliplane — assistant
 DMX — featured artist
 Drumma Boy — producer
 Dub-O — featured artist
 Rami Eadeh — composer, producer
 Briton "Woodro Skillson" Ewart — composer, producer
 Alex Fitts — featured artist
 Frequency — engineer, producer
 Frequency — engineer, producer
 Brian "DJ Frequency" Fryzel — composer
 Synyster Gates — featured artist, guitar
 GB Hitz — producer
 L. Gerrard — composer
 Stephanie Hsu — creative director
 Anthony "DJ Xplosive" Jackson — scratching
 Jazz Feezy — producer
 J.U.S.T.I.C.E. League — producer
 Alex Kickdrum — producer

 Alex Da Kid — producer
 Byron Kirkland — management
 Lil Jon — featured artist
 Livvi Franc — background vocalist for "Warning Shot"
 MGK — primary artist
 Juaquin Malphurs — composer
 Jonathan Mannion — photography
 Fabian Marasciullo — mixing
 Manny Marroquin — mixing
 A. Masone — composer
 Justine Massa — creative coordinator
 Matthew "Spordy" McMahon — photography
 James McMillan — executive producer, management
 MGK — engineer, executive producer, primary artist, producer
 Mat Musto — piano
 R. Nitzan — composer
 Raz Nitzan — composer
 T-Minus — producer
 Harve Pierre — executive producer
 Planet VI — featured artist
 Justin Sampson — assistant, engineer
 Ben Schigel — mixing
 Phil Schlemmer — engineer
 M. Shadows — featured artist, vocals
 Slim Gudz — engineer, producer
 Southside — producer
 SykSense — producer
 Tech N9ne — featured artist
 Twista — featured artist
 Armin van Buuren — composer
 Ashleigh Veverka — management
 Waka Flocka Flame — featured artist
 Irvin Whitlow — composer, producer
 Anna Yvette — featured artist, producer, vocals

Chart performance

Weekly charts

Year-end charts

Certifications

Release history

References

External links

2012 debut albums
Machine Gun Kelly (musician) albums
Bad Boy Records albums
Interscope Records albums
Albums produced by Alex da Kid
Albums produced by Boi-1da
Albums produced by Dame Grease
Albums produced by Drumma Boy
Albums produced by J. R. Rotem
Albums produced by J.U.S.T.I.C.E. League
Albums produced by Southside (record producer)